Raul Paul Marincău (born 27 April 1981) is a Romanian footballer who plays as a defender for the Kreisliga club SV Erbach. Marincău made his Liga I debut on 6 December 1997 for Jiul Petroșani, in a 0–4 defeat against Universitatea Cluj.

Career
Marincău has spent most of his playing career in Romania at clubs such as: Jiul Petroșani, Corvinul Hunedoara, Argeș Pitești, UTA Arad or Universitatea Cluj, but he had also a spell with Russian Premier League side Uralan Elista during 2002 and 2003. He only made one Russian Cup appearance for the senior side before leaving the club.

External links
 
 
 Raul Marincău at fupa.net

1981 births
Living people
People from Deva, Romania
Romanian footballers
Association football defenders
Liga I players
Liga II players
CSM Jiul Petroșani players
CS Corvinul Hunedoara players
FC Argeș Pitești players
CSM Reșița players
FC UTA Arad players
FC Universitatea Cluj players
FC Gloria Buzău players
CS Brănești players
FC Delta Dobrogea Tulcea players
Russian Premier League players
FC Elista players
Romanian expatriate footballers
Romanian expatriate sportspeople in Germany
Expatriate footballers in Germany
Romanian expatriate sportspeople in Russia
Expatriate footballers in Russia